Renan Carvalho Areias (born 18 January 1998), commonly known as Renan Areias, is a Brazilian footballer who currently plays as a midfielder for Criciúma.

Career statistics

Club

Notes

References

External links

1998 births
Living people
Brazilian footballers
Brazil youth international footballers
Brazilian expatriate footballers
Association football midfielders
Sport Club Corinthians Paulista players
Red Bull Brasil players
K.S.V. Roeselare players
F.C. Ashdod players
Hapoel Iksal F.C. players
Associação Desportiva Confiança players
Liga Leumit players
Challenger Pro League players
Israeli Premier League players
Expatriate footballers in Belgium
Expatriate footballers in Israel
Brazilian expatriate sportspeople in Belgium
Brazilian expatriate sportspeople in Israel
Footballers from São Paulo